Nomocharis aperta is an Asian species of flowering plant in the lily family. It is found in the mountains of southwestern China (Tibet, Yunnan, Sichuan) and Myanmar.

Description
Nomocharis aperta is a perennial, herbaceous plant reaching heights of between 25 and 50 centimeters. Flowers are rose-colored.

References

External links
 

Liliaceae
Flora of Asia
Plants described in 1924